Salvador Medina Moreno (born 20 May 1943) is a Mexican sprinter. He competed in the men's 4 × 400 metres relay at the 1968 Summer Olympics.

References

1943 births
Living people
Athletes (track and field) at the 1967 Pan American Games
Athletes (track and field) at the 1968 Summer Olympics
Mexican male sprinters
Olympic athletes of Mexico
Place of birth missing (living people)
Pan American Games competitors for Mexico
20th-century Mexican people